Amalorrhynchus is a genus of beetles belonging to the family Curculionidae.

The genus was first described by Reitter in 1913.

Species:
 Amalorrhynchus lukjanovitshi Korotyaev, 1980
 Amalorrhynchus melanarius (Stephens, 1831)

References

Ceutorhynchini
Curculionidae genera